The 26th KBP Golden Dove Awards is an annual awarding ceremony in the Philippines recognizing television and radio stations from Metro Manila and the provinces, programs, personalities, public service announcements and promotional materials coming from broadcasting companies who are members of the Kapisanan ng mga Brodkaster ng Pilipinas (KBP). The awards ceremony was held at the Ceremonial Hall, Manila Marriott Hotel Grand Ball Room, Resorts World Manila, Resorts Drive, Pasay on May 29, 2018 and was aired on ABS-CBN's "Sunday's Best" on July 29, 2018.

Winners

Stations

Programs

Personalities

Public Service Announcements and Promotional Materials

Special Awards

References

KBP
KBP